NGC 4907 is a barred spiral galaxy located about 270 million light-years away in the constellation of Coma Berenices. It is also classified as a LINER galaxy. NGC 4907 was discovered by astronomer Heinrich d'Arrest on May 5, 1864. The galaxy is a member of the Coma Cluster, located equidistant between NGC 4928 and NGC 4829.

See also 
 List of NGC objects (4001–5000)
 NGC 4921 another barred spiral galaxy in the Coma Cluster

References

External links
 

Barred spiral galaxies
LINER galaxies
Coma Berenices
4907
44819
Astronomical objects discovered in 1864
Coma Cluster